Gingsheim (Alsatian: Gìngse) is a former commune in the Bas-Rhin department in north-eastern France. On 1 January 2016, it was merged into the new commune Wingersheim-les-Quatre-Bans.

Geography
Gingsheim is positioned between Duntzenheim to the east and Hohatzenheim to the west.

The countryside is gently hilly and is used for agriculture

Population

Points of interest
Altar-piece: Oil painting (1897) of St Nicholas by Carola Sorg.

See also
 Communes of the Bas-Rhin department

References

Former communes of Bas-Rhin
Bas-Rhin communes articles needing translation from French Wikipedia
Populated places disestablished in 2016